The Marbella Tennis Open is a professional tennis tournament played on clay courts. It is currently part of the Association of Tennis Professionals (ATP) Challenger Tour and WTA 125K series. The ATP event has been held annually in Marbella, Spain, from 2018 while the WTA edition started in 2022.

Past finals

Men's singles

Women's singles

Men's doubles

Women's doubles

See also
 Andalucia Tennis Experience

References

External links
Official website

ATP Challenger Tour
Clay court tennis tournaments
Tennis tournaments in Spain
Recurring sporting events established in 2018
Sport in Marbella
WTA 125 tournaments